Ben Richter (born 1986) is an American composer, accordionist, and director of Ghost Ensemble, an experimental chamber ensemble based in New York.

Biography
Ben Richter was born in the United States in 1986. Specializing in microtonal accordion performance, he composes chamber music that explores subtle gestures, the interactions of gradual processes, modes of awareness, and Deep Listening. He has collaborated with Pauline Oliveros, Phill Niblock, Carmina Escobar, SEM Ensemble, Nieuw Ensemble, and The Dresden Dolls, among others. He teaches at CalArts and holds an M.M. in music from the Royal Conservatory of The Hague (2012) and a B.A. from Bard College (2008), where he studied with Kyle Gann, Joan Tower, and George Tsontakis and privately with Pauline Oliveros. In 2012, he founded Ghost Ensemble, which frequently performs his music and that of other living composers.

Selected compositions 
Richter's works include:
 Healing Ghost/Destroying Angel (2013), a 60-minute diptych chamber work for Ghost Ensemble.
 Farther Reaches (2013), a slowly building orchestra work exploring timbral shifts and constant portamento movement.
 Rivulose (2015), piano concerto featured at Ostrava Days 2015 and on Czech Radio.
 Wind People (2016), an acoustic chamber work for Ghost Ensemble combining elements of ambient drone, doom metal, and classical music.
 Panthalassa: Dream Music of the Once and Future Ocean (2017), a 46-minute immersive work for just intonation accordion.
 Tides of the Wolf (2019), an opera collaboration with novelist Edie Meidav and vocalist Carmina Escobar.

Discography

as Ben Richter
Panthalassa: Dream Music of the Once and Future Ocean - CD (Infrequent Seams, June 2017)

with Ghost Ensemble 
We Who Walk Again - LP (Indexical, May 2018)
Lightbulb Ensemble & Ghost Ensemble Live at Pioneer Works (Indexical, 2015)

with The Dresden Dolls
The Dresden Dolls: In Paradise - DVD (Roadrunner Records, 2005)

References

External links 
 Official web site

Living people
1986 births
Ambient musicians
Experimental composers
American accordionists
American experimental musicians
21st-century American composers
21st-century classical composers
American classical composers
American classical musicians
American male classical composers
21st-century American male musicians
Bard College alumni
California Institute of the Arts faculty
20th-century American male musicians